Journey for Three is a 1950 New Zealand  black and white immigration propaganda film.

Synopsis
This film dramatised postwar immigration to New Zealand. Three British citizens travel and settle down in New Zealand, and the film shows their hopes, jobs, challenges, and adventures.

Cast
 Elizabeth Armstrong as Cassie McLeod
 Margaret McNulty as Margaret Allen
 Stewart Pilkington as Harry White
 Francis Renner as The Foreman

Production
This was an immigration propaganda film production released by the National Film Unit. The film had a theatrical release in the UK.

Reviews
1950 Ashburton Guardian - Comment on N.Z. film.
1995 featured in New Zealand's contribution to the British Film Institute's Century of Cinema series - Cinema of Unease: A Personal Journey by Sam Neill.
 2011 "...made by the New Zealand National Film Unit, was the most ambitious film the Unit had ever embarked on."

References

External links
 
 Journey for Three Youtube

1950 films
1950s New Zealand films
1950s English-language films
1950s films
1950 in New Zealand
Black-and-white films
Films directed by Michael Forlong
Films set in New Zealand
National Film Unit
New Zealand documentary films